Fiorella Salazar Rojas is a Costa Rican politician. She is the Justice minister.

References 

Living people
Female justice ministers
21st-century Costa Rican women politicians
21st-century Costa Rican politicians
Women government ministers of Costa Rica
Year of birth missing (living people)